Jenison Public Schools is a public school district in Jenison, Michigan.

Schools
Secondary schools:
 Jenison High School
 Jenison Junior High School
Primary schools:
 Bauerwood Elementary
 Bursley Elementary
 Pinewood Elementary
 Rosewood Elementary
 Sandy Hill Elementary
 El Puente
Others:
 Early Childhood Center
 Jenison International Academy

References

External links
 Jenison Public Schools
School districts in Michigan
Education in Ottawa County, Michigan